Nathan Myrick (July 7, 1822 in Westport, New York – June 4, 1903 in St. Paul, Minnesota) was a fur trader who founded La Crosse, Wisconsin in 1841. Myrick was in the fur trade in Prairie du Chien, Wisconsin before traveling north to establish a fur trading post in what is now La Crosse. In 1849, he moved to St. Paul, Minnesota to establish more fur trading posts. He was a brother of Andrew Myrick.

References

Sources

External links
Articles about Nathan Myrick, Wisconsin State Historical Society
The Lumbering Industry of La Crosse, Wisconsin 1841–1905, Selma Sather Casberg, University of Wisconsin–La Crosse, La Crosse, Wisconsin, 1953
Nathan Myrick, 1822 - 1903

1822 births
1903 deaths
People from Westport, New York
People from La Crosse, Wisconsin
People from Saint Paul, Minnesota
American city founders